Belleville Township may refer to:

 Belleville Township, Chautauqua County, Kansas
 Belleville Township, Republic County, Kansas

See also 
 List of Kansas townships
 Belleville Township (disambiguation)

Kansas township disambiguation pages